The Aedui or Haedui (Gaulish: *Aiduoi, 'the Ardent') were a Gallic tribe dwelling in the modern Burgundy region during the Iron Age and the Roman period.

The Aedui had an ambiguous relationship with the Roman Republic and with other Gallic tribes. In 121 BC, they appealed to Rome against the Arverni and Allobroges. During the Gallic Wars (58–50 BC), they gave valuable though not whole-hearted support to Caesar, before eventually giving lukewarm support to Vercingetorix in 52. Although they were involved in the revolts of Iulius Sacrovir in 21 AD and Vindex in 68 AD, their aristocracy became highly Romanized under the Empire.

Name 
They are mentioned as Ardues (Ἄρδυες) by Polybius (2nd c. BC), Haedui by Cicero (mid-1st c. BC) and Caesar (mid-1st c. BC), Haeduos by Livy (late 1st c. BC), Aedui by Pliny (mid-1st c. AD), Aidúōn (Αἰδύων) by Ptolemy (2nd c. AD), and as Aídouoi (Aἴδουοι) by Cassius Dio (3rd c. AD).

The ethnonym Aedui is a latinized form of Gaulish *Aiduoi (sing. *Aiduos), which means 'the Ardent ones'. It derives from the Celtic stem *aidu- ('fire, ardour'; cf. Old Irish áed 'fire', Welsh aidd 'ardour'; also the Irish deity Aéd or Aodh), itself from Proto-Indo-European  ('firewood'; cf. Sanskrit édhas 'bonfire', Latin aedes 'building, temple'; cf. also Ancient Greek Aether 'god of the upper sky' and Aethra 'bright sky', from aíthō 'to ignite, to kindle').

Geography

Territory 
The territory of the Aedui was situated between the Saône and Loire rivers, in a strategic position regarding trade routes. It included most of the modern départements of Saône-et-Loire and Nièvre, the southwestern-part of Côte-d'Or between Beaune and Saulieu, and the southern part of Yonne around Avallon, corresponding to the Saône plains, the Morvan granitic massif, and the low Nivernais plateau, from east to west. They dwelled between the Arverni in the west, the Segusiavi and Ambarri in the south, the Sequani in the east, and the Lingones and Senones in the north.

Settlements 
Three oppida are known from the end of the La Tène period: Vieux-Dun (Dun-les-Places), Le Fou de Verdun (Lavault-de-Frétoy), and Bibracte, which occupied a central position in the Aedian economic system.

During the Roman period, Bibracte was abandoned for Augustodunum ('fortress of Augustus'; modern-day Autun).

Ancient sources 
The country of the Aedui is defined by reports of them in ancient writings. The upper Liger formed their western border, separating them from the Bituriges. The Arar formed their eastern border, separating them from the Sequani. The Sequani did not reside in the region of the confluence of the Dubis and the Arar, and of the Arar into the Rhodanus, as Caesar says that the Helvetii, traveling southward along the pass between the Jura Mountains and the Rhodanus, which belonged to the Sequani, plundered the territory of the Aedui. These circumstances explain an apparent contradiction in Strabo, who in one sentence says that the Aedui lived between the Arar and the Dubis, and in the next, that the Sequani lived across the Arar (eastward).

History

Pre-Roman period 
By the early 3rd century BC, the emergence of groups of settlements with diversified functions, along with the creation of sanctuaries, suggest the beginning of a continuous La Tène settlement in the region.

Roman period 
Outside of the Roman province and prior to Roman rule, Gaul was occupied by self-governing tribes divided into cantons, and each canton was further divided into communes. The Aedui, like other powerful tribes in the region, such as the Arverni, Sequani, and Helvetii, had replaced their monarchy with a council of magistrates called grand-judges.  The grand-judges were under the authority of a senate. This senate was made up of the descendants of ancient royal families. Free men in the tribes were vassals of the heads of these families, in an exchange of military, financial, and political interests.

According to Livy (v. 34), the Aedui took part in the expedition of Bellovesus into Italy in the sixth century BC.  Before Caesar's time, they had attached themselves to the Romans and were honoured with the title of brothers and kinsmen of the Roman people.  When the Sequani, their traditional rivals, defeated and massacred the Aedui at the Battle of Magetobriga in 63 BC, with the assistance of the Germanic chieftain Ariovistus, the Aedui sent the druid Diviciacus to Rome with an appeal to the senate for help; but his mission was unsuccessful.

After his arrival in Gaul in 58 BC, Caesar restored the independence of the Aedui. In spite of this, they subsequently joined the Gallic coalition against Caesar (B. G. vii. 42), but after the surrender of Vercingetorix at the Battle of Alesia, the Aedui gladly returned to their allegiance. Augustus dismantled their capital, Bibracte, on Mont Beuvray, and constructed a new town with a half-Roman, half-Gaulish name, Augustodunum (modern Autun).

In AD 21, during the reign of Tiberius, the Aedui revolted under Julius Sacrovir, and seized Augustodunum, but they were soon put down by Gaius Silius (Tacitus Ann. iii. 43–46). The Aedui were the first of the Gauls to receive from the emperor Claudius the distinction of jus honorum, thus being the first Gauls permitted to become senators.

Until Claudius (41–54 AD), the Aedui were the first northern Gallic people to send senators to Rome.

The oration of Eumenius, in which he pleaded for the restoration of the schools of his native Augustodunum, suggests that the district was then neglected. The chief magistrate of the Aedui in Caesar's time was called the Vergobretus (according to Mommsen, "judgment-worker"). He was elected annually, and possessed powers of life and death, but was forbidden to go beyond the frontiers of his territory.  Certain clientes, or small communities, were also dependent upon the Aedui.

It is possible that the Aedui adopted many of the governmental practices of the Romans, such as electing magistrates and other officials, although it may have been a natural development in their political system. It is thought that other Celtic tribes, such as the Remi and the Baiocasses, also elected their leaders.

Religion 

The Temple of Janus was located just outside the Aedian town of Augustodunum. It probably dates back to the second half of the 1st century AD.

At the end of the La Tène period, religious convergences occurred between the Aedui and the neighbouring Lingones and Sequani in the Saône-Doubs area, as evidenced by the similarity in the practices at the sanctuaries of Nuits-Saint-Georges (Aedui), Mirebeau-sur-Bèze (Lingones) and Mandeure (Sequani).

Political organization 
According to Julius Caesar, the Aedui were one of the strongest Gallic tribes, in rivalry with the Helvetii, Sequani, Remi, and Arverni. Furthermore, the Aedui seemed to work in a semi-republican state, with the powerful Vergobret at least slightly being at the will of the people, similar to the senators of Rome.

See also
 List of peoples of Gaul
 Jublains archeological site

References

Primary sources

Bibliography

Further reading

 
Historical Celtic peoples
Gauls
Tribes involved in the Gallic Wars